Kunjithai ( കുഞ്ഞിത്തൈ ) (meaning "small coconut tree" in Malayalam) is a small village in Paravur Taluk, Ernakulam district in the state of Kerala, India. It is about 26 km from Ernakulam City. It is a lakeside village with the Pallipuram Lake as its western boundary. The ancient port town Muziris (Pattanam) shares its boundary with Kunjithai.

Kunjithai has a healthy population of the Anglo-Indian community which can be considered the highest in the Paravur Taluk and is one of the prominent Anglo-Indian community in Ernakulam district itself. Kunjithai has two places known as Kotta and Kothalam, which are believed to be the ruins of kings. But nothing remains there apart from the place name. Kunjithai is the one of the most fishing boat manufacturing Place in Kerala. Here around 30 Boat yards and 2000 peoples working.

References 

Villages in Ernakulam district